A series of rallies, demonstrations, and blockades opposing the visit of the Indian Prime Minister Narendra Modi were held in Bangladesh from 19 to 29 March, on the celebration of the birth centenary of Bangabandhu Sheikh Mujibur Rahman and the 50th anniversary of Bangladesh's independence from Pakistan. Accusing Narendra Modi of committing crimes against humanity during the 2002 Gujarat riots, the protesters agitated against what they alleged were India's anti-Muslim policies and India's interference in Bangladeshi politics. Protesters demanded the cancellation of the Bangladesh government's invitation to the Indian Prime Minister. The otherwise peaceful protests turned violent when the protesters were attacked by the supporters of the ruling Awami League party along with a crackdown by the law-enforcement agencies, causing the deaths of several protesters throughout the last week of March 2021 in Bangladesh. Initially launched by progressive student organizations including the Bangladesh Students Union, Bangladesh Sadharon Chhatra Odhikar Songrokkhon Parishad, and the Socialist Students' Front, the demonstrations were later joined by the Islamic group Hefazat-e-Islam Bangladesh.

The deadly conflict chiefly began when supporters of Awami League tried to stop the protesters from waving their shoes as a sign of discontent to Modi at Baitul Mukarram mosque, Dhaka. This resulted in violent clashes from both sides. After the incident, the violence then spread to several key districts in the country, leading to damages on public properties. 

Amnesty International in a statement criticized the Bangladesh government for using excessive force on the protesters and urged the government to "respect the right to freedom of assembly and protect peaceful protesters", on 26 March 2021.  After the killings of its supporters on Friday, Hefazat called the strike protesting the killing of its activists by police, and the attack on them by supporters of the ruling party on Sunday, 28 March. "Police opened fire on our peaceful supporters," the group's organizing secretary Azizul Haque told a rally in Chittagong. "We will not let the blood of our brothers go in vain." As of now, the clashes resulted in at least 14 people killed and many injured with Brahmanbaria alone accounted for 10 killed.

Background

Bangladesh declared independence from Pakistan on 26 March 1971, with the diplomatic and military support of India. The 50th instance of 26 March since then marked the golden jubilee of Bangladesh's independence and to celebrate the day Bangladesh government invited the Prime Minister of India, Narendra Modi. Soon after the Indian Prime Minister decided to join the celebration, Bangladeshi students and Islamists declared to resist him from visiting Bangladesh. 

Former Vice-president of Dhaka University Central Students' Union Nurul Haq Nur in a rally in front of the Press Club on 12 March 2021, terming Narendra Modi the "Butcher of Gujrat", said that he is unwelcomed in Bangladesh. On the other hand, the Police chief of Bangladesh declared restrictions on movement during the visit of foreign guests including the Indian Premier on March 15, 2021. He also requested the political parties not to hold programs during the visit of Narendra Modi. 

On 18 March 2021, progressive students' organizations declared a series of protests against the visit of Narendra Modi to Bangladesh including rally, demonstration, effigy burning, and torch-march and on the same day, leaders of the Awami League government-backed students' wing Bangladesh Chhatra League, known for hooliganism and terrorism, declared to deal the protesters and threatened to 'peel off the skin' whoever protests.

Timeline of protest

The first demonstration against the visit of Narendra Modi was held on March 19, 2021, and it has been going on. Bangladesh Police, as well as ruling party-backed organizations Bangladesh Chhatra League, Jubo League, and Bangladesh Awami Swechasebak League, have swopped on the protesters triggering violence, in retaliation from the protesters.

19 March 
 Hundreds of Muslims protested the forthcoming visit of Narendra Modi and call for resisting the Indian premier from a rally that came out of the national mosque Baitul Mukarram in Dhaka. 
 Around 200 students affiliated with progressive students' alliance rallied inside the University of Dhaka and asked Modi not to come.

23 March 
 Bangladesh Chhatra League men snatched away the effigy of Narendra Modi from the activists of the Students' Federation of Bangladesh when they tried to burn that and fled the scene.
 Activists of progressive students' alliance were attacked in front of the Dhaka University's Teacher-Students Center when they tried to burn the effigy of Narendra Modi and Bangladesh Chhatra League men snatched it away once again. A clash erupted when they fought back against the hooligans of the Chhatra League led by Atanu Barman and Ahesun Dhrubo. Around 20 students from the student group were beaten by BSL hooligans including female activists.
 Journalists who were covering the attack on the Anti-Modi protesters were attacked brutally by BSL backed people.

26 March 
 Muslims gathered after the Friday prayer at the Baitul Mukarram mosque at noon and chanted slogans against Narendra Modi. Armed cadres of BSL and Jubo League who took position around the place before the prayer, backed by Police, attacked the protesters inside the compound of the mosque triggering a violent chase-counter chase. Police started shooting rubber bullets targeting the protesters. Many protesters were beaten mercilessly and some received bullet injuries. At least 148 people received treatment in a Dhaka hospital after the gruesome attack.
 The attack in Baitul Mukarram infuriated students at Hathazari of Chittagong, the stronghold of Islamist students. Students came out in the street to protest the attack on their fellows. The demonstration was obstructed by Police while passing the Hathazari Police Station. Angry protesters started attacking police stations, and public properties, prompting police to open fire. Four protesters died in the process.
 One youth protester died in Brahmanbaria when Islamist Hefazat activists attacked the railway station and other adjacent government buildings in protest of the attack on Muslims in Baitul Mukarram.

27 March 
 Four villagers of Brahmanbaria were shot dead by local police and BGB personnel in Brahmanbaria when they tried to block the highway in protest of the death of Hefazat activists.
 Armed cadres of Awami League and Chhatra League attacked a madrasa at Brahmanbaria killing a student inside.
Six police officers were injured as anti-Modi protesters attack police station in Faridpur. The attack was aimed to disrupt return to Dhaka from Gopalganj and Khulna, where Modi visited temples and the mausoleum of Bangabandhu. The police fired rubber bullets to disperse the mob.
 More than 26 policemen got injured during an attack of protesters at aruail police camp. According to the police and locals, several thousand madrasa students accompanied by locals attacked the camp.

28 March 
 During the hartal called by Hefazat supporters on Sunday in the agitation of killings of its protesters by police firing, Hefazat activists brought out processions in the capital's Lalbagh, Paltan, Baitul Mukarram, Mohammadpur, Basila, Saat Masjid and Jatrabari areas in the morning.
 Hartal supporters attacked train and government offices. "Brahmanbaria is burning",  a journalist in the Brahmanbaria town, told Reuters by phone. Hefazat activists burned the music school and museum of Ustad Allaudin Khan. They attacked the biggest Hindu temple in Brahmanbaria district during Dol Purnima puja. They also attacked homes and offices of Awami League leaders in Brahmanbaria. 
Hefazat activists vandalized the Muktijoddha Complex Bhaban, Public Library, and Land Office in Brahmanbaria. Brahmanbaria municipality was forced to stop providing all services to residents as a result of the violence.
 Two activists of Hefazat died after a clash with police in Brahmanbaria.
Hindu temples were also attacked according to media reports.

29 March
 The situation was said to have calmed down as daily life resumed by 7:25 PM local time. Facebook and messenger which were taken down during the protests resumed operation from that time.

Deaths

On 28 March, after the strike, Hefazat leaders claimed 17 people died across the country, with around 500 people receiving injuries during the protests, in a press conference. According to their claim 12 people died in Brahmanbaria, 4 at Hathazari in Chittagong and one at Signboard area in Narayanganj. Local news outlets, however, have reported 14 death counts as of March 28, 2021.

Arrests

During and after the protests, opposition activists were detained and kept in secret detentions. According to the activists they were tortured in custody. Shakil Uzzaman and Mina Al Mamun, the joint-convenors of Bangladesh Chatra Odhikar Parishad, were picked up in suspicious circumstances from the capital Dhaka's Savar area on March 26. On the next day, the joint convenor of Bangladesh Jubo Odhikar Parishad, Nadim Hasan, was abducted from Lalbag area by people who identified themselves as police. Two leaders of the same organization were picked up respectively from Rajshahi and Sylhet reportedly by law enforcers and remained untraceable, on March 28. After more than 24 hours of detention at unknown places, Nadim Hasan, Shakil Uzzaman, Mina Al Mamun, and Md Mazharul Islam were placed in court and charged with violence. More than 100 Islamists were arrested by Bangladesh police during 12 April - 19 April over alleged participation in the violence.

Reaction

To stop the spread of news and cut off communication across the country, the government of Bangladesh blocked Facebook on March 26, from the afternoon. Facebook in a statement claimed that "We are aware that our services have been restricted in Bangladesh." "We’re working to understand more and hope to have full access restored as soon as possible," they added.

International rights group Amnesty International termed the Bangladesh government response to the protest as "Bloody Crackdown" and said, "The Bangladeshi authorities must respect the right to freedom of assembly and protect peaceful protestors."

Twenty eminent citizens of Bangladesh demanded punishment for those responsible for attacking anti-Modi protesters and carrying out violence in Chattogram's Hathazari, in a joint statement. Among the M Hafizuddin Khan, Ali Imam Majumder, Professor Anu Muhammad, Badiul Alam Majumdar, Syeda Rizwana Hasan, Sara Hossain, CR Abrar, Dr. Zafrullah Chowdhury, Asif Nazrul, Shahidul Alam, Hasnat Quaiyum, Nur Khan Liton, Shireen Huq, Jakir Hossain, Perween Hasan, Lubna Marium, Sharmeen Murshid, Firdous Azim, Naila Zaman Khan and Rahnuma Ahmed.

Bangladesh's main opposition party Bangladesh Nationalist Party protested the killing of people on the country's Independence Day for protesting the visit of a foreign national. They declared a countrywide demonstration on March 29 and March 30.

Prominent Hefajat leader Abdual Awal resigned, the decision was said to have been taken due to difference in opinion with other Hefajat leaders during the protests.

See also
GoBackModi

References

Anti-Modi protests
2021 protests
2021 riots
March 2021 crimes in Asia
2021 anti-Modi protests
Riots and civil disorder in Bangladesh
Bangladesh–India relations
Narendra Modi
Protest-related deaths
Hefazat-e-Islam Bangladesh